Arfiviricetes is a class of viruses.

Orders
The following orders are recognized:

 Baphyvirales
 Cirlivirales
 Cremevirales
 Mulpavirales
 Recrevirales
 Rivendellvirales
 Rohanvirales

References

Single-stranded DNA viruses